Parasyscia fossulata is a species of reddish-brown army ant found in Sri Lanka and China.

References

External links

 at antwiki.org

Dorylinae
Hymenoptera of Asia
Insects described in 1895